The Van de Kamp Bakery Building was built in 1930 in the Glassell Park neighborhood of Los Angeles. It served as the headquarters of the chain of bakeries and coffee shops known for their distinctive windmill architecture. The building was designed by New York architect J. Edwin Hopkins to resemble a Dutch 16th century farmhouse. Originally there was a Van de Kamp's store next to the building, which was one of the first Van de Kamp's stores ever made and had the famous Van de Kamp's windmill style design. The building remains the only example of an industrial plant in the Renaissance Revival and Dutch Colonial Revival styles. The bakery closed in October 1990 after Van de Kamps filed for Chapter 11. The building is a designated Los Angeles Historic-Cultural Monument, declared on May 12, 1992.

In 2010, this building underwent a $72-million renovation by the Los Angeles Community College District with the intent of being a Los Angeles City College satellite campus. The site is instead leased to charter school and job training groups.

History 
The building was constructed by Pozzo Construction Co. in 1930. The building was officially designated as a Los Angeles Historic-Cultural Monument on May 12, 1992.

The building is currently leased by the Alliance Leichtman-Levine Family Foundation Environmental Science High School, which is a public high school in the Los Angeles Unified School District.

Design 
Built in a Renaissance Revival style with Dutch Colonial influences, the Van de Kamp Bakery Building was intended to resemble a 16th century Dutch farmhouse.

The 2010 renovation for the LACC satellite campus was implemented by QDG Architecture before being used as a charter school.

References

External links
 Location: 
 Vandekampus.org
 Vandekamps.org

Buildings and structures in Los Angeles
Glassell Park, Los Angeles
Van de Kamp's Los Angeles
Los Angeles Historic-Cultural Monuments
Commercial buildings completed in 1931
1931 establishments in California

Dutch Colonial Revival architecture
Vernacular architecture in California
Northeast Los Angeles